Agrale, previously called AGRISA, is a Brazilian vehicle manufacturer. Established in 1962, it is based in Caxias do Sul in the state of Rio Grande do Sul. Agrale manufactures tractors, commercial vehicles, military vehicles, bus, chassis and engines. Tractors include both self-developed models, and ones based on Zetor designs. The company's current model line-up consists of pick-up trucks and the Marruá SUV. Agrale no longer produces motorcycles or scooters.

Agrale subsidiary "Lintec" produces generators, diesel water pumps, engines, rotary cutters (weed wackers) and materials handling equipment.

History
The company was originally called AGRISA (Indústria Gaúcha de Implementos Agrícolas SA), and built AGRISA-Bungartz tractors under license of the German-based Bungartz company.  Later alliances included Deutz-Fahr, when they built some tractors and trucks under the Agrale-Deutz name, and later with Zetor.  AGRALE is now a part of the Francisco Stedile Group, which includes the Lavrale, Fazenda Três Rios, Germani Foods and Yanmar-Agritech Tractors companies.

Agrale produced about 5000 buses in 2004 

Since 2008, the brand FNM, Fábrica Nacional de Motores, was bought from a group in Rio de Janeiro, from INPI, and resurged as an Electric Delivery Truck called Fábrica Nacional de Modalidades with Joint-Venture Production at Agrale Caxias Do Sul Factory. The first Prototype was finished in December 2020.

Products
The most traditional segment of activity Agrale is the manufacture of small tractors with power from 14.7 hp, intended mainly for use in the vineyards of the wine region of Rio Grande do Sul, near the company headquarters. Today the tractors are offered with power ratings up to 140 hp and offers up to 9.2 tonne trucks, diesel stationary and bus chassis, a segment in which it is acting with more emphasis.

Tractors
 400 Series - The first tractors were produced by Agrale models 415, 416 and 420. The 420 model 4100 gave rise to the following series, being produced until the present day with several changes, mostly cosmetic.
 4000 Series - The 4000 series was composed by the models 4100, 4200 and 4300. Currently, the 4100 remains in production with models 4118, 4230, 4240, featuring versions 4X2, 4X4 and industrial, the latter with an optional natural gas engine. Also part of the line, tractors load model derived from 4230.4 (4x4 version of the model 4230).
 5000 Series
 6000 Series - It consists of three models with 4x4 traction:
 BX6110 - equipped with a turbocharged MWM TD229 EC4, 77 kW (105 hp) 4-cylinder engine
 BX6150 - equipped with, turbocharged MWM TD229 EC6, 103 kW (140 hp) 6-cylinder engine.
 BX6180 - equipped with a turbocharged MWM TD229 EC6, 126 kW (168 hp) 6-cylinder engine.
 Series BX - produced from the 1990s and led to the current 5000 and 6000.

Trucks

The first trucks were models TX-1100 TX-1200 and TX-1600, equipped with MWM 229.3 of three cylinders, or Agrale M-790 twin-cylinder. The trucks were also manufactured in alcohol and gasoline versions, using the four-cylinder engine GM Opal. Agrale currently produces trucks ranging from 6000 to its PBT 20000 kg, most recently with the CA13000 6x2. Agrale uses fiberglass cabs, ensuring strength, durability, thermal and acoustic insulation, many times that of steel cabs.

Current models are:
 Euro III standard (all 4x2)
 Agrale 6000
 Agrale 8500
 Agrale 8500 CD
 Agrale 8500 CE (4.08)
 Agrale 8500 CE (4.12)
 Agrale 9200 CE
 Agrale 13000
 Agrale 13000 6X2
 A Line
 Agrale A8700
 Agrale A10000
 Line LX
 Agrale 8700 LX
 Agrale 10000 LX
 Agrale 14000 LX
 Line S
 Agrale 8700 S
 Agrale 10000 S
 Agrale 8700 TR
 Agrale 14000 S
 Agrale 14000 S 6x2
FNM 832 E & FNM 833 E

Utilities
Agrale produces the Marruá 4x4 Utility vehicle in both a Jeeplike versions, a pickup truck, and as a chassis cab. Current models include:

Military versions
 Military Viatura de Transporte Não Especializada (Non-Specialised Transport, VTNE) 4x4's meeting Euro III standards
 Agrale Marruá AM2 VTNE ½ Ton (four person two door jeep-like vehicle)
 Agrale Marruá AM11/AM11 REC/VTNE/VTL REC (four person four door jeep-like vehicle)
 Agrale Marruá AM21 - VTNE ¾ Ton (eight person two door pick-up vehicle)
 Agrale Marruá AM23 - VTNE ¾ Ton
 Agrale Marruá AM23 CC/CDCC - VTNE ¾ Ton (Chassis cab-container carrier)
 Agrale Marruá AM31 - VTNE 1½ Ton (with dual wheel wheels)
 Agrale Marruá AM41 - VTNE 2½ Ton

Civil versions
 Civil 4x4's meeting Euro V standards
 Agrale Marruá AM200 G2 - Double Cab Pickup
 Agrale Marruá AM200 G2 - Single Cab Pickup
 Agrale Marruá AM300 G2 - Chassis cab

Former civil models 
 Agrale Marruá AM50 - civil version of the Agrale Marruá AM2 VTNE
 Agrale Marruá AM100 - Agrale Marruá AM11/AM11 REC/VTNE/VTL REC based Single Cab Pickup
 Agrale Marruá AM150 - Agrale Marruá AM11/AM11 REC/VTNE/VTL REC based Double Cab Pickup/Chassis cab

Bus chassis
Agrale now offers a competent security and comfort, therefore, developed a wide range of chassis and Rear Engine Advanced, low-floor (low entry) or semi-low which ensures greater accessibility for people with reduced mobility.

Chassis Micro Bus
 Agrale 1800
 MA 5.5 T
 MA 7.5
 MA 7.9
 MA 8.5
 MA 8.5 T
 MA 8.5 super
 MA 8.7 Euro V
 MA 9.2
 MA 9.2 Euro V
 MA 9.2 Green E-tronic
 MA 10.0
 MA 10.0 Euro V

Chassis for buses and midi
 MA 12.0
 MA 12.0 Euro V
 MA 15.0
 MA 15.0 Euro V
 MA 17.0 Euro V
 MT LE 12.0
 MT 12.0 Euro V LE
 MT 12.0 SB
 MT 15.0 Buggy
 MT LE 15.0
 MT 15.0 Euro V LE
 MT 15.0 SB

Engines
Through its subsidiary Lintec, also in Caxias do Sul, Agrale manufactures engines and power equipment (water pumps, lawn mowers and generators), with wide range of power. Lintec also sells Ruggerini and Lombardini engines alongside its own Agrale brand (790 m, m795w, etc.), water or air cooled, and Lintec (LD 1500, LD 2500, etc.) water cooled.

Assembler
Agrale also assembled International trucks, a brand acquired by NC2 Group brand. Agrale currently assembles heavy and light Internationals, a partnership that began in 1998 trucks and ended in 2013 with 43,000 units produced, which was mounted the first truck International 4700 brand.

Former Products

Tractors 
Agrale BX 6180
Agrale BX 6150
Agrale BX 6110
Agrale 7215
Agrale 575.4
Agrale 575.4 Compact
Agrale 5105.4
Agrale 5105

Trucks
Agrale 6000
Agrale 8500
Agrale 9200
Agrale 13000
Agrale A8700
Agrale A10000

Buses
Agrale 8.5
Agrale MA 12.0
Agrale MA 15.0
Agrale MT 12.0 SB
Agrale MT 15.0 LE
Agrale MT 17.0 LE

Motorcycles

Agrale manufactured over 400,000 motorcycles from 1984 and 1997. The models were: Agrale SXT, SST, Elefant, Dakar, Explorer, and Elefantre. Agrale motorcycles were based on Cagiva models.

Agrale in Argentina
In 2007 in Argentina, it is declared an automotive terminal by the National Government and at the same time it acquires an industrial plant on the National Route Nº5 in the Buenos Aires Province city of Mercedes, becoming the first productive pole outside of Caxias do Sul (Brazil). The total investment reached eleven and a half million dollars, allocated to equipment and conditioning of the facilities. The total property has 200,000 square meters, of which 9,098 are covered.
From there, he began his productive activities in October 2008 with the production of his first chassis for a 12-ton bus with a rear engine. The production was diversified in January 2009 with the production of a bus chassis with front engine, later another 17-ton bus chassis, in June it produced the light truck 7500 and in July the first minibus.
In addition to this line, Agrale Argentina developed a prototype locally for both urban and medium-distance transport. In May 2009, the plant obtained the ISO Quality Certification. In mid-2009 the company had invested more than 12 million dollars in our country, employing 56 people directly between their productive and administrative activities.
In October 2009, the then governor Scioli completed the official presentation of the Industrial Plant Mercedes of the firm Agrale Argentina SA in National Route No. 5 at the height of kilometer 89.
After finishing 2015, it recorded a record in its local production (more than 1300 units) in its Mercedes plant installed more than 10 years ago in the province of Buenos Aires and with a record also in its turnover in sales, Agrale Argentina, manufacturer of trucks, buses and tractors.

See also
 List of trucks

References

External links

 
 Linctec, subsidiary

Bus manufacturers of Brazil
Car manufacturers of Brazil
Tractor manufacturers of Brazil
Truck manufacturers of Brazil
Defunct motorcycle manufacturers of Brazil
Privately held companies of Brazil
Defence companies of Brazil
Brazilian brands
Companies based in Rio Grande do Sul
Vehicle manufacturing companies established in 1962
1962 establishments in Brazil